2007 Kabul Premier League was the second season of the Kabul Premier League. 12 Teams competed and the defending champion Ordu Kabul F.C. topped in the table once again by winning 10 out of 11 Games played. Kabul Bank F.C. finished in second winning 9 out of 11 games played while drawn one game and lost one game.

League standings

References
 RSSSF

Kabul Premier League seasons
1
Afghan
Afghan